Irving Mauro Zurita García (born 27 September 1991) is a Mexican professional footballer who plays as a left-back for Liga de Expansión MX club Atlético Morelia.

External links

 

Living people
1991 births
Footballers from Mexico City
Mexican footballers
Atlante F.C. footballers
Atlético Morelia players
Lobos BUAP footballers
Liga MX players
Association football defenders
Ascenso MX players
Liga de Expansión MX players